LDP may mean:

Politics

Liberal Democratic Party (disambiguation), a list of liberal democratic parties
Laban ng Demokratikong Pilipino, a political party in the Philippines
Lebanese Democratic Party, a political party in Lebanon
League for Democracy Party, a political party in Cambodia
Liberal Democratic Party of Australia, a political party in Australia
Liberal Democratic Party of Germany, a political party in East Germany
Liberal Democratic Party (Japan), a political party in Japan
Liberal Democratic Party (Serbia), a political party in Serbia
Liberal Democratic Party (Turkey), a political party in Turkey

Technology

Label Distribution Protocol, a routing protocol used in Multiprotocol Label Switching networks
Laser designator pod
Laserdisc player
Linked Data Platform, a Semantic Web specification
Linux Documentation Project
Local differential privacy

Mathematics

Large deviation principle, the rate function in mathematics

Locations

Damansara–Puchong Expressway or Lebuhraya Damansara–Puchong (LDP), an expressway in Malaysia
Long-distance footpaths in the UK (long-distance paths)

Language

Lingwa de planeta, a conlang mentioned in Worldlang

Other

Loan deficiency payments, a U.S. agriculture policy farm income support program
Local Development Plan, a form of town and country planning document in Wales
Long day plant, a plant that flowers when the night length falls below its critical photoperiod
Long Distance (Skateboard) Pumping
Leadership development Program, a type of professional development program for businesses and organizations
Landed Duty Paid (LDP), a shipping term indicating the seller will import to country of destination and pay duty on goods